Beare  is a village in the civil parish of Broadclyst in Devon, England.

References

External links

Villages in Devon